The ShortWork Awards are annual film awards, presented by the Whistler Film Festival to honour the best short films screened at the festival.

Prior to 2012, a single award was presented inclusive of both Canadian and international short films; in that year, separate awards were created for Canadian and international films. In 2010, a category was also introduced for the best short film by British Columbia film students.

On two occasions in 2015 and 2016, an award was also presented for best screenplay in a Canadian short film, but this has not been presented since 2016.

Best ShortWork

Best Canadian ShortWork

Best Screenplay

Best International ShortWork

Best British Columbia Student ShortWork

References

Canadian film awards
Whistler Film Festival